Royal Raymond Rife (May 16, 1888 – August 5, 1971) was an American inventor and early exponent of high-magnification time-lapse cine-micrography.

Rife is known for his microscopes, which he claimed could observe live microorganisms with a magnification considered impossible for his time, and for an "oscillating beam ray" invention, which he thought could treat various ailments by "devitalizing disease organisms" using radio waves. Although he came to collaborate with scientists, doctors and inventors of the epoch, and his findings were published in newspapers and scientific journals like the Smithsonian Institution annual report of 1944, they were later rejected by the American Medical Association (AMA), the American Cancer Society (ACS) and mainstream science.

Rife's supporters continue to claim that impulses of electromagnetic frequencies can disable cancerous cells and other microorganisms responsible for diseases. Most of these claims have no scientific research to back them up and Rife machines are not approved for treatment by health authorities in the world. Multiple promoters have been convicted of health fraud and sent to prison.

Life and work 

Little reliable published information exists describing Rife's life and work. In the 1930s, he made several optical compound microscopes and, using a movie camera, took time-lapse microscopy movies of microbes. He also built microscopes that included polarizers.  Rife claimed magnifications of 17,000× or more for some of these microscopes.

A report published by the Smithsonian Institution described one of these microscopes as equipped for "transmitted and monochromatic beam dark-field, polarized, and slit-ultra illumination, including also a special device for crystallography". It added that several doctors had attended a demonstration of another of Rife's microscopes and had been impressed by its clarity and high magnification.

Some of the observations Rife claimed to have made with his microscopes are, however, contradicted by modern findings. For instance, he reported that under certain conditions typhoid bacteria changed into a much smaller form, and claimed that most cancerous tumours contained a microbe that had no less than five forms, one of which was indistinguishable from E. coli while another resembled a fungus.

Rife also reported that a 'beam ray' device of his invention could destroy microbial pathogens. Rife claimed to have documented a "Mortal Oscillatory Rate" for various pathogenic organisms, and to be able to destroy the organisms by vibrating them using radio waves of this particular frequency. According to the San Diego Evening Tribune in 1938, Rife stopped short of claiming that he could cure cancer, but did argue that he could "devitalize disease organisms" in living tissue, "with certain exceptions". In a 1931 profile, Rife warned against "medical fakers" who claim to cure disease using "electrical 'vibrations, stating that his work did not uphold such claims.

An obituary in the Daily Californian described his death at the age of 83 on August 5, 1971, stating that he died penniless and embittered by the failure of his devices to garner scientific acceptance. Rife blamed the scientific rejection of his claims on a conspiracy involving the American Medical Association (AMA), the Department of Public Health, and other elements of "organized medicine", which had "brainwashed and intimidated" his colleagues.

Health fraud after his death 
Interest in Rife's claims was revived in some alternative medical circles by the 1987 book by Barry Lynes, The Cancer Cure That Worked, which claimed that Rife had succeeded in curing cancer, but that his work was suppressed by a powerful conspiracy headed by the American Medical Association. 
The American Cancer Society (ACS) describes Lynes' claims as implausible, noting that the book was written "in a style typical of conspiratorial theorists", and that Lynes "... cites names, dates, events and places, giving the appearance of authenticity to a mixture of historical documents and speculations selectively spun into a web far too complex to permit verification by any thing short of an army of investigators with unlimited resources." 

After this book's publication, a variety of devices bearing Rife's name were marketed as cures for diverse diseases such as cancer and AIDS. An analysis by Electronics Australia found that one typical 'Rife device' cost AU$105 for a rudimentary circuit that simply produced a tiny pulsed electrical current (at a single fixed frequency of about 40kHz).  It consisted of a nine-volt battery, wiring, a switch, a standard 555 timer chip and two short lengths of copper tubing meant to act as handheld electrodes, delivering a current which the author estimated at 1 milliamp at most.  He described this as "the tip of an enormous iceberg", with a wide range of more elaborate devices also on sale from different suppliers, varying widely in design and ranging in price from AU$1,500 to AU$34,000.  

Such 'Rife devices' have figured prominently in several cases of health fraud in the U.S., typically centered around the uselessness of the devices and the grandiose claims with which they are marketed. In a 1996 case, the marketers of a 'Rife device' claiming to cure numerous diseases including cancer and AIDS were convicted of felony health fraud. The sentencing judge described them as "target[ing] the most vulnerable people, including those suffering from terminal disease" and providing false hope. In some cases cancer patients who ceased chemotherapy and instead used these devices have died. A Mount Vernon couple Donald and Sharon Brandt, who operated a clandestine health-care clinic based on Rife's inventions has been convicted for a short imprisonment period. Rife devices are currently classified as a subset of radionics devices, which are generally viewed as  pseudomedicine by mainstream experts. In Australia, the use of Rife machines has been blamed for the deaths of cancer patients who might have been cured with conventional therapy.  In 2002 John Bryon Krueger, who operated the Royal Rife Research Society, was sentenced to 12 years in prison for his role in a murder and also received a concurrent 30-month sentence for illegally selling Rife devices. In 2009 a U.S. court convicted James Folsom of 26 felony counts for sale of the Rife devices sold as 'NatureTronics', 'AstroPulse', 'BioSolutions', 'Energy Wellness', and 'Global Wellness'.

Legacy
In 1994, the American Cancer Society's journal CA: A Cancer Journal for Clinicians criticized Rife's methods and devices in an article titled "Questionable Methods of Cancer Management: Electronic Devices". The ACS reported that Rife machines were being sold in a "pyramid-like, multilevel marketing scheme". A key component in the marketing of Rife devices has been the claim, initially put forward by Rife himself, that the devices were being suppressed by an establishment conspiracy against cancer "cures". Although 'Rife devices' are not registered by the U.S. Food and Drug Administration and have been linked to deaths among cancer sufferers, The Seattle Times reported that over 300 people attended the 2006 Rife International Health Conference in Seattle, where dozens of unregistered devices were sold.

Cancer Research UK, the world's largest independent cancer research charity, has stated: 

A 2000 article in The Sydney Morning Herald warned:

See also
 Electromagnetic therapy (alternative medicine)
 List of ineffective cancer treatments
 Medical applications of radio frequency
 Pulsed radiofrequency#Therapeutic uses

References

External links 
 Electromagnetic Therapy from the American Cancer Society
 Rife devices from the National Council Against Health Fraud

1888 births
1971 deaths
20th-century American inventors
Alternative cancer treatment advocates
Health fraud
People from Douglas County, Nebraska
Radionic practitioners
American scientific instrument makers